= Koocheh festival =

The Koocheh music festival is a local and traditional music festival held annually in the city of Bushehr. It hosts local music groups from all over Iran, with an aim to preserve the local singing and musical heritage.

This event was also held in Mumbai, India on September 9, 2018, under the name "Koocheh Culture Persian Arts Nights."

== Establishment and Organization ==
Ehsan Abdipour, one of the organizers of this festival, has said:

"The Koocheh Music Festival is completely independent and is held without financial support from any individual or organization. The charter of this festival does not consider any profits or salaries for the organizers and ticket sales are only carried out with the aim of covering the costs of organizing and paying the musical groups."

Mohsen Sharifian is also a prominent figure in organizing and establishing this festival.
